Uzury (from  - tip, top, edge) is a village in the Olkhonsky District of Irkutsk region of Russia, a part of the Khuzhirskiy municipal unit. Located in the Bay Haga-Yaman of Lake Baikal at the Eastern shore of Olkhon Island in 30 km northeast from the municipal unit centre — village Khuzhir.

A permanent meteorological station and a laboratory of the Siberian Institute of the Earth's crust are operating in the village.
Population:  consists mainly of the staff of meteorological station.

The Bay Haga-Yaman is known for its archaeological sites of the Neolithic period (4th—2nd millennia BC) and Late Iron Age (5th—10th century AD). In a cave near the village a Neolithic burial was found in 1956. The archaeological findings include fragments of pottery, items made of bone, arrowheads and an axe.

Gallery

References

Rural localities in Irkutsk Oblast
Archaeological sites in Siberia
Populated places on Lake Baikal
Olkhon Island